The molecular formula C8H6 (molar mass: 102.13 g/mol, exact mass: 102.0470 u) may refer to:

 Benzocyclobutadiene
 Pentalene
 Phenylacetylene
 Calicene, or triapentafulvalene
 Cubene

Molecular formulas